Japanese bird cherry may refer to:
Prunus grayana
Prunus ssiori